Ohio Issue 1, the Congressional Redistricting Procedures Amendment, was a legislatively referred constitutional amendment on the May 8, 2018 ballot in Ohio. The ballot measure was approved with 74.89% of the vote.

Contents
The proposal appeared on the ballot as follows:

Results

The amendment was approved in a landslide, with 74.89% of the vote.

References

External links

2018
Ohio
2018 Ohio elections